USS L-10 (SS-50) was an L-class submarine of the United States Navy.

Description
The L-class boats designed by Electric Boat (L-1 to L-4 and L-9 to L-11) were built to slightly different specifications from the other L boats, which were designed by Lake Torpedo Boat, and are sometimes considered a separate class. They displaced  on the surface and  submerged. The L-class submarines had a crew of 28 officers and enlisted men.

For surface running, the Electric Boat submarines were powered by two  diesel engines, each driving one propeller shaft. When submerged each propeller was driven by a  electric motor. They could reach  on the surface and  underwater.

The boats were armed with four 18-inch (450 mm) torpedo tubes in the bow. They carried four reloads, for a total of eight torpedoes. The Electric Boat submarines were initially not fitted with a deck gun; a single 3"/50 caliber gun on a disappearing mount was added during the war.

Construction and career
L-10s keel was laid down on 17 February 1915 by Fore River Shipbuilding Company of Quincy, Massachusetts. She was launched on 16 March 1916 sponsored by Miss Catherine Rush, and commissioned on 2 August 1916.

Service history
Assigned to the Atlantic Submarine Flotilla, L-10 operated along the United States East Coast until April 1917 developing new techniques or undersea warfare.

Following the United States's entry into World War I, submarines were needed to protect Allied shipping lanes to Europe.  After an extensive overhaul, preparing her for the task ahead, L-10 departed Newport, Rhode Island, on 4 December, reaching the Azores on 19 December. She patrolled waters off the Azores for the next month before joining Submarine Division 5 in the British Isles in January 1918. Based in Britain throughout the rest of the war, L-10 and the other ships of her division conducted anti-U-boat patrols.

After the Armistice with Germany on 11 November, L-10 remained in England until sailing for the United States on 3 January 1919.  Arriving Philadelphia, Pennsylvania, on 1 February, the submarine operated along the Atlantic coast for the next four years, developing submarine warfare tactics. L-10 decommissioned at Philadelphia on 5 May 1922, and was sold on 31 July 1922 to Joseph G. Hitner of Philadelphia.

Navy Cross
The commanding officer of L-10, Lieutenant Commander James C. Van de Carr, received the Navy Cross for his services during World War I.

The Navy Cross is awarded to Lieutenant Commander James C. Van de Carr, U.S. Navy, for distinguished service in the line of his profession in command of the AL-10. While en route from Newport to the Azores, the submarine which he commanded was separated from the escort and the other submarines of the squadron, leaving him without a rendezvous. He thereupon proceeded to destination successfully, assuming the great responsibility of starting a 1,700-mile Atlantic Ocean run in winter weather and in a submarine of a class that had never been considered reliable under such conditions. He later performed creditable submarine patrol service within the war zone.

Notes

References

External links
 

United States L-class submarines
World War I submarines of the United States
Ships built in Quincy, Massachusetts
1916 ships